"Monster You Made" is the seventh single from Pop Evil, and is the second single from War of Angels, their second studio album.  The song begins with a sorrowful riff before lead vocalist Leigh Kakaty initial hurt riddled verse.

Premise 
The song is said to be written from the point of view of the band themselves being a successful ensemble dealing with the allures that come with notoriety in the music business.  The song begs an individual to look at their life.

Video 
The video was filmed in Chicago, Illinois by Robby Starbuck.

Chart performance

References 

Pop Evil songs
2011 songs
2011 singles
Songs written by Dave Bassett (songwriter)
Song recordings produced by Johnny K
MNRK Music Group singles
Rock ballads
2010s ballads